The 2011 Indonesia Super League U-21 Final was a football match which was played on Sunday, 8 May 2010. It was the 3rd final of the Indonesia Super League U-21. The match was played at the Soemantri Brodjonegoro Stadium in Jakarta and was contested by Semen Padang U-21 of Padang and Persela U-21 from Lamongan. Semen Padang U-21 and Persela U-21 was a debutant of the final stage.

Persela beat Semen Padang with the score 2-0.

Road to Bandung

Match details

See also
2010-11 Indonesia Super League U-21

References

External links
Indonesia Super League standings (including U-21 ISL)

Final